TSV Unterhaching is a German volleyball club which plays its home matches at the Bayernwerk Sportarena in Unterhaching. It plays in the 1. Bundesliga.

Honours
1. Bundesliga
Runners up: 2009, 2010, 2012

German Cup
Winners (4): 2009, 2010, 2011, 2013

See also
 Germany men's national volleyball team

External links
Official website 
Volleybox profile

German volleyball clubs
Munich (district)